Florian Dietz (born 3 August 1998) is a German professional footballer who plays as a forward for Bundesliga club 1. FC Köln.

Career 
Having previously played for 1. FC Köln II, Dietz was promoted to the club's first team in mid 2022.

References

External links
 

1998 births
Living people
People from Bad Neustadt an der Saale
Sportspeople from Lower Franconia
German footballers
Footballers from Bavaria
Association football forwards
FC Carl Zeiss Jena players
SV Werder Bremen II players
SpVgg Unterhaching players
1. FC Köln II players
3. Liga players
Regionalliga players
1. FC Köln players